Bang Sue Junction, is a railway station and junction located in Bangkok. It is situated on Thoet Damri Road, Bang Sue district. It is owned and operated by State Railway of Thailand, serves the Northern, Northeastern, and Southern Lines, and is a junction for the North/Northeast and South Lines.

Following the opening of Krung Thep Aphiwat Central Terminal, located adjacent to the station, all long-distance services stopped operating from the station from 19 January 2023. Currently, only ordinary trains (that call at all stations) and commuter trains which terminate at Bangkok (Hua Lamphong) railway station operate at the station. This is because there is currently no rail connection between the elevated platforms of the new station and the railway line south of the station towards Bangkok (Hua Lamphong) station. The station is expected to close, when the rail connection is completed.

Transport links include the Bangkok MRT, and the BMTA.

History

Bang Sue opened in 1898 as part of Thailand's first railway between Bangkok and Ayutthaya. On 1 January 1927, it became a junction for the Northern/Northeastern Line and the Southern Line after the construction of the rail link between Bang Sue and Taling Chan, over Rama VI Bridge. In 1989, Bang Sue was separated into two railway stations. The original building was renamed "Bang Sue 1" was used for Northern and Northeastern Line services while the new building "Bang Sue 2" was used for Southern Line services. The distance between the buildings were about 200 metres apart.

Bang Sue 1 was closed on 15 August 2016 in preparation for the construction of the new railway station, while trains on all lines now call at the Bang Sue 2 station, which is still in operation.

Bus connections
The following BMTA and Private Jointed routes serve this station: 
 50 (Rama VII – Lumphini Park)
 52 (Pak Kret – Bang Sue)
 65 (Wat Pak Nam (Nonthaburi) – Sanam Luang)
 67 (Wat Samian Nari – CentralPlaza Rama III)
 70 (Prachaniwet 3 – Sanam Luang)
 97 (Ministry of Public Health – Priest Hospital) (Ordinary Bus)
 97 (Ministry of Public Health – Victory Monument) (Air-Conditioned Bus (BMTA))
 97 (Wat Thang Luang – Priest Hospital) (Air-Conditioned Bus (Private Jointed))

Phahonyothin freight yard
Bang Sue Junction is also the location of the Phahonyothin cargo yard. With an expanse of about 50 rail tracks and sidings, it is the largest rail yard in the whole of Thailand. It is located about 1.5 kilometers from the station and is the main cargo yard for freight services around Thailand.

References

Railway stations in Bangkok
Buildings and structures in Bangkok